Fürth is a Landkreis (district) in Bavaria, Germany. It is bounded by (from the east and clockwise) the cities of Fürth and Nuremberg, and by the districts of Roth, Ansbach, Neustadt (Aisch)-Bad Windsheim and Erlangen-Höchstadt.

History

In the 13th and most of the 14th century the region was a regional centre of the Hohenzollern state. The Cadolzburg (a castle west of Nuremberg) was the seat of the local rulers.

The present district was established in 1972.

In 2003 the administrative seat was moved from Fürth to Zirndorf. (Nonetheless, Fürth remains the official capital of the district.)

Geography

The district is occupied by the western Nuremberg metropolitan area.

Politics 
The district is part of the Fürth constituency for elections to the Bundestag, currently represented by Christian Schmidt.

Coat of arms
The coat of arms displays:
 The eagle which is the heraldic bird of Brandenburg (in medieval times the region was a part of Brandenburg-Ansbach)
 The red and white bars are from the arms of Nuremberg
 The ear and cogwheel are symbols for agriculture and industry

Towns and municipalities

References

External links

Official Website 
Official district Website 

 
Districts of Bavaria